Port Alsworth is a census-designated place (CDP) in Lake and Peninsula Borough, Alaska, United States. The population was 186 at the 2020 census, up from 159 in 2010. It is the most populated community in the borough.

Port Alsworth was founded in 1950 by Babe Alsworth, a missionary and bush pilot, and Mary Alsworth, who was the town's first postmaster.

Port Alsworth is located on private land within Lake Clark National Park and Preserve and is the site of the national park's field headquarters.

Samaritan's Purse operates a lodge for wounded United States military veterans located within the town for "Operation Heal Our Patriots" (OHOP). There is also a summer camp called "Tanalian Bible Camp" where youth, ages 8–19, from the surrounding villages can attend.

From the summer of 2013 to the spring of 2014, the local Tanalian School underwent renovation and a dearly needed expansion. The renovation involved tripling school square footage, all new furniture, and doubling the size of the gym.

Geography
Port Alsworth is located in northern Lake and Peninsula Borough at  (60.208281, -154.306586). It sits on the south shore of Lake Clark at the mouth of the Tanalian River.

Climate
Port Alsworth has a subarctic climate (Köppen Dfc).

Demographics

Port Alsworth first appeared on the 1940 U.S. Census as the unincorporated village of "Tanalian Point". It next appeared on the 1960 census under its present name of Port Alsworth. It did not reappear again until 1990, when it was made a census-designated place (CDP).

As of the census of 2000, there were 104 people, 34 households, and 24 families residing in the CDP. The population density was 4.6 people per square mile (1.8/km2). There were 70 housing units at an average density of 3.1/sq mi (1.2/km2). The racial makeup of the CDP was 77.88% White, 4.81% Native American, and 17.31% from two or more races.

There were 34 households, out of which 47.1% had children under the age of 18 living with them, 67.6% were married couples living together, 2.9% had a female householder with no husband present, and 26.5% were non-families. 23.5% of all households were made up of individuals, and none had someone living alone who was 65 years of age or older. The average household size was 3.06 and the average family size was 3.64.

In the CDP, the population was spread out, with 41.3% under the age of 18, 7.7% from 18 to 24, 28.8% from 25 to 44, 18.3% from 45 to 64, and 3.8% who were 65 years of age or older. The median age was 26 years. For every 100 females, there were 85.7 males. For every 100 females age 18 and over, there were 84.8 males.

The median income for a household in the CDP was $58,750.00, and the median income for a family was $62,083. Males had a median income of $50,417 versus $17,083 for females. The per capita income for the CDP was $21,716. There were no families and 6.0% of the population living below the poverty line, including no under eighteens and none of those over 64.

Transportation
Air taxis serve the private Port Alsworth Airport and the public Wilder/Natwick LLC Airport.

References

External links
 The Farm Lodge
 Glen Alsworth
 Village of Port Alsworth
  Subsistence harvests and uses of wild resources in Iliamna, Newhalen, Nondalton, Pedro Bay, and Port Alsworth, Alaska, 2004 / by James A. Fall ... [et al.]. Hosted by Alaska State Publications Program

Census-designated places in Lake and Peninsula Borough, Alaska
Census-designated places in Alaska